Leonid Vasilyevich Nazarenko (born 21 March 1955) is a Russian football coach and a former player. He manages FC Biolog-Novokubansk.

Honours
 Olympic bronze: 1976.

International career
Nazarenko made his debut for USSR on 10 March 1976 in a friendly against Czechoslovakia. He played in the quarterfinal of UEFA Euro 1976 (USSR did not qualify for the final tournament).

References

External links
 Profile on rusteam.permian.ru 

1955 births
People from Gulkevichsky District
Living people
Russian people of Ukrainian descent
Soviet footballers
Soviet Union international footballers
Russian football managers
Russian footballers
FC SKA Rostov-on-Don players
PFC CSKA Moscow players
Olympic footballers of the Soviet Union
Footballers at the 1976 Summer Olympics
Olympic bronze medalists for the Soviet Union
FC Kuban Krasnodar managers
Russian Premier League managers
FC Akhmat Grozny managers
Russian expatriate football managers
Expatriate football managers in Kazakhstan
FC Luch Vladivostok managers
Russian expatriate sportspeople in Kazakhstan
Olympic medalists in football
Medalists at the 1976 Summer Olympics
Association football forwards
Sportspeople from Krasnodar Krai